Follett Independent School District is a public school district based in Follett, Texas (USA).

The district has one school that serves students in grades pre-kindergarten through twelve.

Follett won the 1974 state eight-man football championship and finished as the 1975 runner-up (the 1975 season was the last that the eight-man title was contested as a UIL event).

History
The district changed to a four day school week for most weeks, but not all weeks, in fall 2022.

Academic achievement
In 2009, the school district was rated "recognized" by the Texas Education Agency.

Special programs

Athletics
Follett High School plays six-man football.

See also

List of school districts in Texas

References

External links
Follett ISD

School districts in Lipscomb County, Texas